"Someone Loves You Honey" is a song written by Don Devaney, originally released by American country music singer Johnny Rodriguez in 1974 on his fourth album, Songs About Ladies and Love. It was recorded by American country music artist Charley Pride and released in January 1978 as the second single and title track from the album Someone Loves You Honey. The song was Pride's 20th number one on the country chart.  The single stayed at number one for two weeks and spent a total of 12 weeks on the country chart.

June Lodge recorded a version of the song in 1980, which became the best-selling single of 1982 in the Netherlands, and American singer Lutricia McNeal had a big hit with her version of "Someone Loves You Honey" in 1998.

Charts

J.C. Lodge version

British singer June Lodge covered "Someone Loves You Honey" in 1982, featured by Jamaican DJ Prince Mohammed. It was the first single and title track of her debut album.  The song reached #1 in Belgium and The Netherlands.

Charts

Weekly charts

Year-end charts

Lutricia McNeal version

American singer Lutricia McNeal released a version of "Someone Loves You Honey" in 1998. It served as the fifth single from her debut album, My Side of Town (1997). The song peaked within the top 10 in Hungary and the United Kingdom and within the top 20 in Austria and Norway.

Music video
The music video for "Someone Loves You Honey" was directed by Stuart Gosling. It first aired in September 1998. Gosling also directed the videos for "My Side of Town" and "Stranded".

Track listing
 Europe CD maxi (1998)
 "Someone Loves You Honey" (radio remix) (3:00) 
 "Someone Loves You Honey" (Andre's Boogie Buster remix) (5:09) 
 "Someone Loves You Honey" (Steve Antony & 12 Stone hip hop mix) (3:54) 
 "Someone Loves You Honey" (T-Total mix) (6:24) 
 "Stranded" (unplugged) (3:34)

 UK CD maxi (1998)
 "Someone Loves You Honey" (radio edit) (3:02) 
 "Someone Loves You Honey" (Steve Antony R&B mix) (4:10) 
 "Someone Loves You Honey" (Club Asylum remix edit) (4:05)
 "Someone Loves You Honey" (Steve Antony & 12 Stone hip hop mix) (3:52)

Charts

Weekly charts

Year-end charts

References

1974 songs
Johnny Rodriguez songs
Charley Pride songs
1978 singles
1982 singles
1998 singles
RCA Records singles
Number-one singles in Belgium
Dutch Top 40 number-one singles
Music videos directed by Stuart Gosling